Trissodoris euphaedra is a moth in the family Cosmopterigidae. It is found in Australia.

References

Natural History Museum Lepidoptera generic names catalog

Cosmopteriginae